David John 'Jock' McConchie (30 May 1910 – 26 April 1998) was a former Australian rules footballer who played with Richmond and Fitzroy in the Victorian Football League (VFL).

Notes

External links 

1910 births
1998 deaths
Australian rules footballers from Victoria (Australia)
Richmond Football Club players
Fitzroy Football Club players
Sandringham Football Club players